The bombardment of Martuni was the bombardment of the cities, towns, and villages in the Martuni Province of the self-proclaimed Republic of Artsakh, which is de jure a part of Azerbaijan. It was carried out by Azerbaijani Armed Forces during the Second Nagorno-Karabakh War. The city Martuni, along with the de facto capital Stepanakert, were badly damaged as a result of shelling. The shelling resulted in the deaths of five civilians. 1,203 buildings were damaged in the province as a result of the bombardment, according to Artsakh Urban Development Ministry. Victoria Gevorgyan, a resident of the Martuni Province of Nagorno-Karabakh, became the first child killed on the very first day of the war.

Background 

The clashes were part of the Nagorno-Karabakh conflict over the disputed region of Nagorno-Karabakh with an ethnic Armenian majority. The region is a de jure part of Azerbaijan, but is mostly under the de facto control of the self-proclaimed Republic of Artsakh, which is supported by Armenia. Ethnic violence began in the late 1980s and exploded into a full war following the dissolution of the USSR in 1991. The war ended with a ceasefire in 1994, with the Republic of Artsakh controlling most of the Nagorno-Karabakh region, as well as the surrounding districts of Aghdam, Jabrayil, Fuzuli, Kalbajar, Qubadli, Lachin and Zangilan of Azerbaijan.

Timeline 

The shelling of Martuni began on 27 September 2020.

On 1 October 2020, the town of Martuni in Nagorno-Karabakh was subjected to artillery fire and bombardment by the Azerbaijani Armed Forces. The town was also shelled by multiple rocket launcher TOS-1, which hit residential buildings.

Casualties 

According to Head of Martuni regional administration of the Republic of Artsakh Edik Avanesyan, as of the beginning of October, 5 residents were killed and 10 residents were wounded in the city of Martuni. Infrastructure was also destroyed. Residents of Martuni were forced to hide in shelters.

Reactions

Amnesty International 

Following the 2020 Nagorno-Karabakh ceasefire agreement, Amnesty International visited strike sites in Armenia, Azerbaijan and Nagorno-Karabakh.

Human Rights Watch 
Human Rights Watch and Armenian authorities stated that at least nine medical facilities were damaged in Martuni and other districts of Nagorno-Karabakh during the conflict.

See also 
 2020 bombardment of Stepanakert
2020 Ghazanchetsots Cathedral shelling

References 

Nagorno-Karabakh conflict
Massacres of the 2020 Nagorno-Karabakh war
War crimes in Azerbaijan
Azerbaijani war crimes